Jonathan Howard may refer to:
Jonathan Howard (footballer) (born 1971), English footballer
Jonathan Howard (actor), English actor
Jon Howard (born 1985), musician
Jonathon Howard, see List of Guggenheim Fellowships awarded in 1996
Jonathan Howard, Brooklyn-based science writer
Jonathan L. Howard, British writer and game designer

See also
John Howard (disambiguation)